St Andrew's Church, Hove may refer to:
 St Andrew's Church, Church Road, Hove, former parish church in Church Road
 St Andrew's Church, Waterloo Street, Hove, redundant church on the Brunswick estate

See also
St. Andrew's Church (disambiguation)